Gen. (Retd.) Abu Belal Muhammad Shafiul Haq (born 1 December 1958) is a retired Bangladesh army general. He was the chief of army staff of the Bangladesh Army from 25 June 2015 to 25 June 2018. Before becoming the army head, he served as the principal staff officer of Prime Minister's Office of the Armed Forces Division. He has also served as an aide-de-camp to the president of Bangladesh. He was commissioned into the Armoured corps of the Bangladesh Army from 6th SSC (Short Service Commission) in June 1978.

Early life
Abu Belal Muhammad Shafiul Huq was born on 1 December 1958 in Noakhali, Bangladesh. He passed Secondary School Certificate (SSC) from Dinajpur Zilla School in 1972. Belal obtained his Bachelor of Arts degree from Dhaka University and master's degree on ‘Defense Studies’ from National University Bangladesh and master's degree in philosophy from Bangladesh University of Professionals. His brother Annisul Huq was elected Mayor of Dhaka North City Corporation in April 2015.

Military career
ABM Huq received formal education from Dhaka University and afterward joined Bangladesh Military Academy on 22 July, 1977. After completion of training, he was commissioned in Bengal Lancers on 18 June 1978 from 6th SSC (Short Service Commission). He was adjudged as the best all-round cadet of his batch and was awarded Sword of Honor (an award given to the best meritorious cadet in Bangladeshi military forces). In a distinguished career spanning 40 years, Huq has held a variety of command, staff and instructional appointments. As a staff, he served as the aide-de-camp (ADC) to the president of Bangladesh, brigade major (BM) of an infantry brigade and colonel staff of an infantry division. He commanded two tank units, three brigades (one armored and two infantry) and two divisions (19th and 33rd). He also served as military secretary and adjutant general of the army.

UN missions
From 1988 to 1989, Shafiul Huq served as a military observer with the United Nations Iran-Iraq Military Observer Group (UNIIMOG). Huq was appointed deputy force commander and chief military observer of UNMEE on 4 January 2007.

Personal life
Huq is married to Shoma Huq. They have a son named Marzuq, and a daughter. Anisul Huq, the first mayor of Dhaka North City Corporation is his elder brother. His father Shariful Huq was the former director of Bangladesh Ansar and took retirement in 1982.

Retirement
Belal retired from the army with effect from 25 June 2018.

Honours

References

External links

|-

1958 births
Living people
Chiefs of Army Staff, Bangladesh
Bangladesh Army generals
Bangladesh University of Professionals alumni
University of Dhaka alumni
People from Noakhali District
United States Army Command and General Staff College alumni
Principal Staff Officers (Bangladesh)